Just Fly is the sixth studio album and seventh album overall by American country rock band Pure Prairie League, released by RCA Records in 1978 (see 1978 in music).

Track listing
"Place in the Middle" (L & T Goshorn, Scanlan)
"Slim Pickin's" (Powell)
"Love Will Grow" (T Goshorn)
"You Don't Have to Be Alone" (L Goshorn, Reilly)
"Love Is Falling" (T Goshorn)
"Just Fly" (T Goshorn)
"Lifetime" (L Goshorn)
"Working in the Coal Mine" (Allen Toussaint)
"My Young Girl" (Powell)
"Bad Dream" (T Goshorn, Hinds, Reilly)

Personnel

Larry Goshorn – guitar, vocals
Tim Goshorn – guitar, vocals
George Powell – guitar, vocals
Michael Reilly – bass, vocals
Michael Connor – keyboards
Billy Hinds – drums

Production
Producer: Alan V. Abrahams

Charts
Album – Billboard (United States)

Pure Prairie League albums
1978 albums
Albums arranged by Jimmie Haskell
RCA Records albums